Erik Kase Romero is an American record producer, recording engineer and session instrumentalist.

Work
As a producer and engineer, Kase Romero began working primarily at the Lake House Recording in Asbury Park, New Jersey, in the early 2010s, and is noted for his work with Lorde and the Bouncing Souls. He has also produced every album by Deal Casino, since their EP Heck. In addition to studio production, Kase Romero does arrangements, such as playing a Hammond B3 for the Jackson Pines' album Gas Station Blues & Diamond Rings. Music journalist Bob Makin describes some of Kase Romero's signature production nuances as "bouncy bass lines and sweet gang vocals."

Kase Romero played with Jeff Lane and Natalie Newbold in the groups Green Paper and the Humboldts, before forming dollys in 2013. They describe their music as "poppy, harmony filled music that's fun to listen to," and they released three albums, and one EP. He also played in Allison Strong's studio band, who released the studio album March Towards the Sun, in 2014. After dolly's disbanded in 2017, Kase Romero joined as bassist for the band the Front Bottoms.

Producer

References
Citations

Bibliography

External links

Record producers from New Jersey
Living people
Year of birth missing (living people)